Acqueville is the name of several communes in France:

 Acqueville, Calvados, in the Calvados département
 Acqueville, Manche, in the Manche département